Kim Hyo-jin (born February 10, 1984) is a South Korean actress and model. She began modeling in teen magazines, and made her acting debut in 1999. She is best known for playing the youngest of the three sisters in sex comedy film Everybody Has Secrets. She made her theater debut in 2009 in the play A Midsummer Night's Dream and followed this up by appearing in the theatrical production Fool for Love a year later. In 2020, she played a con artist in the television drama Private Lives.

Career 
Kim began her career modeling in teen magazines, and made her acting debut in 1999. After a series of forgettable roles, she is best known for playing the youngest of the three sisters in sex comedy film Everybody Has Secrets, and the female lead in family drama I Am Happy.

Though she continues to act in mainstream films and TV dramas such as Mary Stayed Out All Night, in recent years Kim has become more adventurous in her choice of projects. She made her theater debut in the plays A Midsummer Night's Dream, and Fool for Love, then made an acting leap into queer cinema. Kim said portraying a bisexual in Five Senses of Eros (later expanded to In My End Is My Beginning) and a lesbian in Life is Peachy was not a problem for her: "I approached the film in this way: Two people meet and fall in love. And the person that I fall in love with happens to be a woman."

In 2011 Kim replaced Han Chae-young in the Korea-China-Japan joint production Strangers 6, which tells the story of six individuals assigned by the highest level authorities of their respective countries to protect the three countries' joint economic area from being infiltrated by a hostile organization. Filming in Japan was delayed by the 2011 earthquake and tsunami, and the TV series aired on Japan's WOWOW TV and Korea's Channel A in 2012.

After appearing in Im Sang-soo's erotic suspense drama The Taste of Money, Kim starred opposite Hidetoshi Nishijima in the Korea-Japan joint production Genome Hazard, a film adaptation of Tsukasaki Siro's same-titled sci-fi mystery novel.

In 2020, after a long hiatus, she appeared in television drama Private Lives (JTBC), playing a con artist alongside Seohyun and Go Kyung-pyo.

Personal life 
Kim first met actor-director Yoo Ji-tae in 2003 when they were models for a clothing brand, and their friendship turned into a romantic relationship in 2006. One of the few Korean star couples who openly admitted their dating status, they are very active in charitable organizations, and in 2011 were both appointed as honorary ambassadors for World Vision.

They announced their engagement in August 2011 (Kim reportedly turned down a movie role to prepare for her upcoming nuptials), and subsequently released pre-wedding photos. Their minimalist invitation was made from environmentally friendly paper and had the number 1,825 written on it, the exact amount of the days the two have spent together as a couple. They were married at the Shilla Hotel in Seoul on December 2, 2011. The  date marked the couple's fifth anniversary together and was booked by Yoo one year in advance despite landing on a Friday – an unusual day for a wedding. The ceremony was officiated by the president of World Vision Korea; Yoo and Kim then donated a portion of their monetary  gifts to the organization to help build an elementary and middle school in Myanmar. The couple have two sons, born on July 5, 2014 and April 15, 2019.

Kim adheres to a vegetarian diet for ethical and health reasons.

Filmography

Film

Television series

Theater 
 A Midsummer Night's Dream (2009)
 Fool for Love (2010)

Discography 
 "Bei Mir Bist Du Schoen" (Everybody Has Secrets OST, 2004)
 "(I Love You) For Sentimental Reasons" (Everybody Has Secrets OST, 2004) 
 "눈을 뜨면" (A Dream Comes True OST, 2009)

Awards 
 2000 KBS Drama Awards: Best New Actress (RNA)
 2004 SBS Entertainment Awards: Best New Actress in a Sitcom (Wuri's Family)
 2004 Golden Cinematography Awards: Best New Actress (Everybody Has Secrets)
 2012 Asia Model Awards: Model Star Award

References

External links 
 
 Kim Hyo-jin at Namoo Actors
 

South Korean television actresses
South Korean child actresses
South Korean film actresses
South Korean stage actresses
South Korean female models
1984 births
Living people
People from Seoul
Actresses from Seoul
Models from Seoul
20th-century South Korean actresses
21st-century South Korean actresses